Kihle is a surname. Notable people with the surname include:

Anker Kihle (1917–2000), Norwegian footballer
Harald Kihle (1905–1997), Norwegian painter and illustrator
Morten Kihle (born 1967), Norwegian footballer

See also
Kile (surname)

Norwegian-language surnames